Reginald Owen Raven (26 November 1884  4 April 1936) was an English cricketer who played for Northamptonshire from 1905 to 1921 and was club captain in the 1920 and 1921 seasons. He was born in Baldock, Hertfordshire, on 26 November 1884 and died in Eastbourne, Sussex, on 4 April 1936. He appeared in 31 first-class matches as a right-handed batsman and scored 766 runs with a highest score of 59.

Notes

1884 births
1936 deaths
English cricketers
Northamptonshire cricketers
Northamptonshire cricket captains